Martin Engelbrecht (16 September 1684, Augsburg - 18 January 1756, Augsburg) was a German Baroque engraver and publisher.

External links

https://portal.dnb.de/opac.htm?method=simpleSearch&query=118684728

German engravers
Businesspeople from Augsburg
1684 births
1756 deaths